Jenna Maroney (born Yustrepa Gronkowitz; February 24, 1969) is a fictional character on the American television series 30 Rock,  played by Jane Krakowski.

For her portrayal of Maroney, Krakowski was nominated four times for the Prime time Emmy Award for Outstanding Supporting Actress in a Comedy Series, and also received seven Screen Actors Guild Award nominations, winning one.

Character development
In Tina Fey's original pilot script for 30 Rock, Jenna was named "Jenna DeCarlo", and The Girlie Show was titled Friday Night Bits with Jenna DeCarlo. In the unaired pilot for the show, Rachel Dratch, a former SNL cast member, played the role of Jenna. In August 2006, executive producer Lorne Michaels announced that Dratch would be replaced as Jenna. Later in the month, NBC announced that Krakowski had replaced Dratch, and that the character was renamed "Jenna Maroney".

Despite being credited as a regular, the character does not appear in every episode, having been absent from five of the 21 episodes of the first season, three of the 15 episodes of the second season, and two of the 22 episodes of the third season. She appeared in all subsequent episodes starting from Season 4.

Fictional biography
Jenna was born Yustrepa Gronkowitz on February 24, 1969 in Tampa, FL, and grew up in Bakersfield, CA. In "The Return of Avery Jessup", however, Jenna mentions being from the Florida Panhandle, from a town called "Toilet Swamp Cove". She also is revealed to have a strong Southern accent that she conceals. In "Queen of Jordan 2: Mystery of the Phantom Pooper", it was revealed that she was conceived in a Florida bathroom. Her ethnic origin is that of an Ashkenazi Jew (with an extra chromosome), as revealed through a DNA sample, which Jack mistakenly thought belonged to Kaylie Hooper. In "The One with the Cast of Night Court", she mentions that she has had hand reduction surgery. Jenna's father, Werner (or possibly Travis) Maroney was a burger server in suburban Santa Barbara, before leaving her mother, Verna (Jan Hooks), for a "curly-haired surfer" named Roberta — which hurt her.  In "Secret Santa", she reveals to Jack "Danny" Baker that after that, her mother forced her to sit on every mall Santa's lap in Bakersfield in an attempt to find him. It is hinted that because of this, Jenna has developed "daddy issues". However, despite all this, Jenna still expresses affection for her father, claiming that she will always be his "little girl".

Jenna started her singing career when she was young, by singing Christmas carols in Sears, as a distraction while her mother shoplifted.  Jenna went to elementary and presumably high school on a boat which was sunk by some Miami Heat fans. Jenna studied game show pointing and theatre superstitions, and also majored in portraying prom queens and murdered runaways (mentioned in "Black Light Attack") at the Royal Tampa Academy of Dramatic Tricks.  Jenna also studied voice at Northwestern University where she first met Liz Lemon in 1993.

A recurring joke in the show is that Jenna has had many dysfunctional relationships. By the time she was 12, she was dating a boy in a fraternity, a possible reference to National Lampoon's Animal House. She has been engaged to a congressman (when she was 16 years old) and to David Blaine. Jenna mentioned she lost her virginity to a boat salesman on a water bed. She has dated a sniper (who threatened to kill her but was just bluffing because he couldn't face his mother let alone kill someone), O. J. Simpson, a music producer (hinted at having been Red One), and a mob boss. She has been in at least two three-ways, one with Tom and Roseanne Arnold (long after the couple was divorced), and another with two of the Backstreet Boys, in which she claimed she was "not really necessary." She has also had sex with Kevin Federline. Jenna also claimed to have had a relationship with Mickey Rourke, and his over-the-top attempts at killing her (such as trying to launch her with a catapult) are a recurring joke on the series. However, in the series finale, she breaks the fourth wall and tells the audience that she has never actually met Rourke; despite this, in the episode "Murphy Brown Lied to Us", Rourke does actually try to kill her by sending her a flower bouquet full of spiders, which instead land on Tracy.

Jenna's husband Paul L'astname (Will Forte) is a "gender dysmorphic bi-genitalia pansexual" and a professional female impersonator most renowned for his performances as Jenna. She met him at a Jenna Maroney impersonator contest in which she came in fourth and he placed first. Before they were married it was revealed that she is so attracted to him because he gives her the opportunity to date herself. Throughout the series, during their relationship they are shown performing various, unusual sexual acts and rituals.

Fictional career
Jenna started off in theater, notably in Pippin; despite co-star Irene Ryan dying on stage, Jenna continued performing anyway (as revealed in "Live Show"). Later performances included The Jenna Chronicles: A One-Wormy Show in 1996 and Con Air: The Musical in 1997, where she appears to have played Rachel Ticotin character. She was nominated for a Cable ACE Award for her work on HBO Arliss . She appeared for three episodes on the show Night Court as a werewolf lawyer named Sparky Monroe and is blamed by the cast for leading to the show's cancellation.  She also appeared in an episode of Law & Order as a "lady rapist" and from a poster in her dressing room, had also starred in a production of the Broadway musical Evita. Jenna also starred in a pilot for a police drama named Good Looking, in which she played the protagonist Alexis Goodlooking, whose special skill was being good at looking for clues.

Jenna was the star of The Girlie Show, a sketch comedy series that was created by her friend Liz Lemon. Jenna's star billing is reduced drastically when Jack Donaghy is hired as a new network vice president and brings in Tracy Jordan, a popular but unpredictable actor. Jack further decides that Tracy is a higher priority than Jenna, so he orders the show's title change to TGS with Tracy Jordan. This makes Jenna furious because she is no longer the star of the show, and believed that Liz gave in to Jack's demands. In addition she finds herself at the mercy of Tracy's antics, the writing staff's constant pranks, and Jack's constant avoidance of her (his reason is that she is not promotable for the show). But despite all this, Liz assures Jenna that her future on the show is safe (Lemon forces Jack to sign a contract stating he will never fire Jenna in the pilot).

When she is not working on TGS, Jenna stars in a series of low-budget films, including her first starring role, The Rural Juror, written by John Grisham's brother Kevin; Take My Hand, a romantic comedy that went through so many re-writes that it became a torture porn film, Jackie Jormp-Jomp a biopic based on the life of Janis Joplin, in which Joplin's name and music could not be used for legal reasons; Trivial Pursuit: The Movie, a movie based on the board game, in which Jenna portrayed Arts & Leisure; and Nights talkers, a werewolf film to be shot in Iceland that had production shut down when the producers realized that the movie had to be shot at night and Iceland only had one minute of darkness per day. Jenna also played Avery Jessup in Kidnapped By Danger, a made-for-TV movie about Jack's wife Avery (Elizabeth Banks), who was being held prisoner in North Korea. Jenna proudly announced at Jack and Avery's would-be vow renewal/divorcing ceremony, that "Kidnapped By Danger" is now available on Sega Genesis. Jenna was banned for life from the Golden Globe Awards after trying to bribe the Hollywood Foreign Press Association into giving her an award for the Lifetime TV movie Sister, Can You Spare a Breast?. She also played a criminal profiler named Jill St. Ferrari in an original Lifetime mini series Hushed Raping.

Jenna is also a singer and possibly a rapper, having once participated in a Gangsta rap contest. She has been a somewhat successful pop star overseas, with one of her hits, "Muffin Top", reaching number one in Israel and number four in Belgium. In the fourth season premiere, Jenna decided that she needed to "go country" to help her career, and in a promotion for NBC's tennis coverage, she made her country debut with the single "Tennis Night In America." During the sixth season, Jenna was a judge on the singing talent competition show America's Kids' Got Singing. In season seven, Jenna comes out with a hit song called "I Caught Crabs in Paradise," which attracts many fans from Florida, who called themselves "Crab Catchers". Liz and Jack realize that, since Florida is the swing state in the 2012 election and almost everyone in Florida is loyal to Jenna, Jenna could be the one to decide whether Barack Obama or Mitt Romney is voted president. They subsequently try to sway Jenna's vote (Jack lobbying for Romney and Liz for Obama.) In season seven, Jenna has a hit single, "Balls", which despite extensive airplay, she is outraged to discover earned her very little money due to music piracy.

Jenna also performs on stage, once appearing in Mystic Pizza: The Musical, an off-Broadway musical version of the film Mystic Pizza. As her role required her to eat 32 slices of pizza on stage each week, Jenna gained a large amount of weight at this time. She took advantage of it, however, by becoming a spokesmodel for Enormé, a perfume for plus-sized women that had the slogan "Enormé: Make him chase the chunk." The writers of TGS also took advantage of Jenna's weight gain, writing plus-sized sketches and giving her a catchphrase "Me want food!". Eventually, Jack tells Jenna that on television an actress can't be "in between" fat and thin, so she has to either lose 30 pounds or gain 60, and Jenna loses the weight again.

After the cancellation of TGS, Jenna decides to become a dramatic actress, starting with a guest spot on Law & Order: Special Victims Unit. However, after learning that she would only play a corpse, Jenna gives up that dream and takes her career to Los Angeles, but immediately leaves after seeing how many beautiful younger women live there. Ultimately, she reveals plans to star in a Broadway musical version of The Rural Juror, and sings the musical's main theme at the finale of TGS (and 30 Rock). It is revealed that a year later, Jenna will force her way on stage to claim the Tony Award for Best Actress in a Musical, despite her name not being called and Alice Ripley being the real winner.

References

30 Rock characters
Fictional actors
Fictional characters from California
Fictional characters from Tampa, Florida
Fictional prostitutes
Fictional singers
Television characters introduced in 2006
Fictional television personalities
Narcissism in television
American female characters in television